Kildare County Council is the authority responsible for local government in County Kildare, Ireland. As a county council, it is governed by the Local Government Act 2001. The council is responsible for housing and community, roads and transportation, urban planning and development, amenity and culture, and environment. The council has 40 elected members. Elections are held every five years and are by single transferable vote. The head of the council has the title of Cathaoirleach (Chairperson). The county administration is headed by a Chief Executive, Sonya Kavanagh. The county town is Naas.

History
The county Council were originally based at Naas Courthouse but, after a major fire in the courthouse, moved to the former St Mary's Fever Hospital in the late 1950s. By late 1990s, the old hospital buildings were in poor condition, and the county council identified the former Devoy Barracks site as its preferred location for new facilities. It moved to Áras Chill Dara on the site of the old barracks site in 2006.

Local Electoral Areas and Municipal Districts
Kildare County Council is divided into the following municipal districts and local electoral areas, defined by electoral divisions.

Councillors
The following were elected at the 2019 Kildare County Council election, under the boundaries which existed at the time.

Councillors by electoral area
This list reflects the order in which councillors were elected on 24 May 2019.

Notes

Co-options

References

External links

Politics of County Kildare
County councils in the Republic of Ireland